(known as MGP Junior in 2002) was a Swedish televised song competition for children aged 8 to 15, organised by  (SVT). The competing songs were primarily in Swedish and written by the participants themselves.

History
In 2002 and again from 2006 to 2009, it was used to select the entry to represent Sweden in Melodi Grand Prix Nordic, a song contest between Scandinavian countries. Between – and –, the winners participated in the Junior Eurovision Song Contest (JESC) instead, a similar competition with countries across Europe. In 2006, SVT withdrew from JESC along with Denmark and Norway and revived MGP Nordic.

In 2010, SVT returned to the Junior Eurovision Song Contest, although the entrant was selected internally.  returned in 2012, with the winner being decided by only a jury. In 2015,  was cancelled to focus on a new singing contest called . If Sweden were return to the Junior Eurovision Song Contest in the future, they would use a new selection format to replace , as  runs from October to November.

Shortly after the Junior Eurovision Song Contest 2021, SVT and Norway's broadcaster NRK revealed that delegations were sent to that year's host city Paris to watch how much the contest evolved. As of 2023, SVT has yet to return to Junior Eurovision, regardless of selection process.

Editions

See also 
 MGP Nordic
 Sweden in the Junior Eurovision Song Contest

References 

Junior Eurovision Song Contest
MGP Nordic
Melodifestivalen
Singing competitions
Singing talent shows
2002 Swedish television series debuts
2014 Swedish television series endings
2000s Swedish television series
2010s Swedish television series
Swedish children's television series
Swedish-language television shows
Swedish music television series
Recurring events established in 2002
Recurring events disestablished in 2014